The Bronze Bauhinia Star (BBS) is the lowest rank in Order of the Bauhinia Star in Hong Kong, created in 1997 to replace the British honours system of the Order of the British Empire after the transfer of sovereignty to People's Republic of China and the establishment of the Hong Kong Special Administrative Region (HKSAR).

It is awarded to persons who have given outstanding service over a long period of time, but in a more limited field or way than that required for the Silver Bauhinia Star.

List of awardees

1998

1999

2000

2001

2002

2003

2004

2005

2006

2007

2008

2009

2010

Withdrawn
Dr Lew Mon-hung was awarded the BBS in 2010 but then stripped of the honour from 3 
April 2020.

2011

2012

2013

2014

2015

2016

2017

2018

2019

2020

2021

2022

See also
Silver Bauhinia Star
Gold Bauhinia Star
Orders, decorations, and medals of Hong Kong

References

Orders, decorations, and medals of Hong Kong
Lists of Hong Kong people
Awards established in 1997